Friday Ossai Osanebi (born October 7th) is a member of the Delta State House of Assembly the Lawmaker representing Ndokwa East Local Government Constituency in the State House of Assembly.

Early life and education 

Friday Osanebi was born on October 7, 1980, He grew up with his families, Mother and Father, Chief and Mrs Ossai Osanebi of Umuedem Quarters Beneku Town, Ndokwa East Local Government Area of Delta State.

He also studied law in the prestigious University of Kaduna..He went to Eke Model Primary School in Kwale, Ndokwa West Local Government Area of Delta State and Orogun Grammar School He later proceeded to prestigious University Of Enugu, (ESUT)  where he studied Material and Metallurgical Engineering.

Career 
Osanebi is the Lawmaker representing Ndokwa East Local Government Constituency in the State House of Assembly. He is the youngest legislator in Delta State House of Assembly.

References

External links 
 https://twitter.com/fridayosanebi

1980 births
Living people
Delta State politicians